Signed in law in 1994 by U.S. President Bill Clinton, this act was meant to streamline the U.S. international broadcasting and provide a cost-effective way to continue Radio Free Europe/ Radio Liberty, Voice of America, and Radio Marti. It placed control of the international broadcasting under the United States Information Agency.

History
In 1958, President Eisenhower in an address to the United Nations proposed monitoring radio broadcasts:

I believe that this Assembly should ... consider means for monitoring the radio broadcasts directed across national frontiers in the troubled Near East area. It should then examine complaints from these nations which consider their national security jeopardized by external propaganda.

In the 1960s, President Kennedy to build an international broadcasting arm of the United States to as a way to promote foreign policy and overthrow communism. In 1976, President Gerald Ford signed the Voice of America charter that established it as the leading branch of US international broadcasting.

In 1993, the Clinton Administration proposed cutting the budget for Radio Free Europe and Radio Liberty in order to reduce budget expenditures. However, after working with the Congress, the International Broadcasting Act was born.

Original law
This Act (Public Law 103-236) consolidated all non-military, U.S. Government international broadcast services under a Broadcasting Board of Governors (BBG) and also created the International Broadcasting Bureau (IBB). The BBG is an independent government agency created to replace the Board for International Broadcasting and consolidate Voice of America broadcasting.

In this law, the president appoints one member of the board as the chairman of the board. The Secretary of State also serves on the board.

Besides combining current radio service, this act also created the Radio Free Asia – a network aimed at Burma, China, Cambodia, Laos, North Korea, and Vietnam.

Congressional updates
In September 2009, the 111th Congress amended the International Broadcasting Act to allow a one-year extension of the operation of Radio Free Asia.

In 2002, the Act was amended to include the Radio Free Afghanistan.

In May 1994, the president announce the continuation of Radio Free Asia after 2009 was dependent on its increased international broadcasting and ability to reach its audience.

References

United States foreign relations legislation
103rd United States Congress
International broadcasting